Peter Hayes may refer to:

 Peter Hayes (actor) (born 1957), Australian actor and director
 Peter Hayes (cricketer) (born 1954), former English cricketer
 Peter Hayes (died 2001), Australian horse trainer, son of Colin Hayes
 Peter Hayes (diplomat) (born 1963), British diplomat
 Peter Hayes (footballer) (born 1938), Australian footballer for Collingwood
 Peter Hayes (historian), Holocaust historian
 Peter Hayes (lawyer) (1953–2007), Australian barrister
 Peter Hayes (musician) (born 1976), American indie rock guitarist and singer
 Peter Hayes (sculptor) (born 1946)
 Peter J. Hayes, energy policy activist
 Peter Lind Hayes (1915–1998), vaudeville entertainer

See also
 Peter Hay (disambiguation)